Campbells may refer to:

Clan Campbell
Campbell Soup Company or Campbell's

See also
Campbell (disambiguation)